Luís Filipe Pimenta (born 6 March 1986) is a Portuguese professional footballer.

Career
Pimenta first started his footballing career at the academy of FC Lausanne-Sport. Early on in his time with the club he made two appearances as they were then in the second division during the 2002-03 season. However, following the bankruptcy of Lausanne-Sport the following season, Pimenta joined BSC Young Boys. After initially playing with the side's academy team, he would go on to feature for the reserves but a lack of goals kept him from maintaining a place in the squad. This prompted the player to seek more playing time elsewhere on loan, joining Portuguese club C.F. União de Coimbra then playing in the fourth-tier. Following a stay of a year and a half there, he returned to Switzerland and left Young Boys for FC Biel-Bienne where he remained for only six months. He then joined FC Baulmes of the third division where he managed an impressive 14 goals in nine matches which drew the attention of his former club FC Lausanne-Sport, now back in the Swiss Challenge League, transferring in the latter part of the 2008-09 season. The highlight of his time during his second stint with Lausanne came as helped the club in their run to the 2010 Swiss Cup final, along the way scoring in the quarter-finals against his former team BSC Young Boys, although they would go to lose to FC Basel in the end. Released at the end of the season, Pimenta would go on to claim a succession of one year contracts with several clubs including FC Stade Nyonnais, FC Lugano, and FC Chiasso. In the summer of 2013, the player rejoined FC Lausanne-Sport for a third time although as the club currently play in the Swiss Super League he will finally get his chance to feature in Switzerland's top division.

In the summer 2017, Pimenta joined FC Bavois.

References

External links
 Player page on World Football

1986 births
Living people
Portuguese footballers
Portuguese expatriate footballers
Portuguese expatriate sportspeople in Switzerland
Expatriate footballers in Switzerland
Association football forwards
FC Lausanne-Sport players
FC Biel-Bienne players
FC Stade Nyonnais players
FC Lugano players
BSC Young Boys players
C.F. União de Coimbra players
FC Chiasso players
S.C. Beira-Mar players
FC Le Mont players
Swiss Super League players
Swiss Challenge League players
Sportspeople from Aveiro District